Richard Rudolf Walter Siepmann known as Walter Siepmann, Sr. (March 11, 1902 – December 16, 1985) was a German industrialist, engineer and inventor. He was the youngest son of Hugo Siepmann and prominent member of the Siepmann family. He was the majority owner of Siepmann Group, an industrial concern, as well as a board member of Commerzbank and board director of the Mechanical Engineering Industry Association (VDMA). Since 1940 he served as a councilor of Belecke (Warstein) for the Christian Democratic Union (CDU).

Early life and education 
Walter Siepmann was born March 11, 1902, in Warstein, Kingdom of Prussia, the youngest of three children of industrialist Hugo Siepmann and Luise Emilie Johanna Lämmerhirt. His mother was a daughter of Alfred Lämmerhirt, who founded the predecessor company of Westfalia Dinnendahl Gröppel in 1872. He grew up on his father's estate located at Hauptstrasse 145 in Warstein, close to his cousins, which also lived on the property and would later engage in business activities with him in the family conglomerate.

Siepmann completed his schooling years in Warstein, Lippstadt and Hagen. After completing his Abitur, he studied mechanical engineering at the Technical University of Darmstadt graduating in 1926. He and his elder brother started to become active in the Siepmann company in 1922, respectively 1926. His brother previously lived and worked in Berlin.

Career 

Initially, Siepmann and his brother were employed as directors and took-over the management and technical development of the company, which at the beginning was still known as Peters & Co. Most of the technical development of Siepmann can be credited to him as he began to develop and patent his inventions in the field of Ventiles and fixtures on an international level. This success is still a key element for the company up to this day and his products are used globally. During his tenure in the management of Siepmann he also became involved in various board of directors as well as advisory board roles such as with Commerzbank, one of the major banking corporations in Germany as well as the Mechanical Engineering Industry Association (VDMA).

Due to the Great Depression the company struggled and had to reduce staffing from 400 (1927) to 140 (1932), only in 1933 the company became a benefactor of the growing Nazi Germany, which needed suppliers for armament orders. Following those economical impacts they grew back very rapidly increasing staff from 143 (1932) to 312 (April 1934). Since 1937 the Siepmann company was the second largest drop forge factory in Germany and one of the most modern in entire Europe. There were 2,000–3,000 employees within the Siepmann companies. Since 1938, the company has been known as Siepmann-Werke, Inh. Hugo und Emil Siepmann & Söhne OHG (en. Siepmann-Works, Prop. Hugo and Emil Siepmann & Sons). In the 1940s it became a stock corporation, but was later turned back into a GmbH & Co KG. In 1946, they formed the subsidiary PERSTA Steel Fixtures GmbH & Co KG and the third generation entered management of the company.

In the course of his work in management, he developed numerous international patents for applications (Valves, housings and fittings). The market entry to North America followed the successful development of new types of oil fittings for mineral oil companies, primarily in the US and Canada. Under the leadership of his son-in-law, Georg König, who was then the sales manager at PERSTA, Siepmann set up a branch in Montreal to sell the valves, the now defunct Forged Steel Valve Limited. His brother Alfred graduated from Humboldt University of Berlin with a degree in business administration. Siepmann's cousin, Ernst Siepmann, a son of Emil Siepmann was a fellow student of Alfried Krupp von Bohlen und Halbach, industrialist and main heir to Krupp, which ultimately became a member of the supervisory board of Siepmann. During the 1940s, Siepmann acquired the majority of the Siepmann concern, and became sole proprietor. He was ultimately able to buy-out several of his cousins, since he had acquired substantial wealth through his technical inventions, which were patented worldwide (this included industrial fittings, ventiles and other appliances). He handed over the company to his youngest son, Walter Siepmann, Jr. (1943-2021), gradually since 1969.

Politics 
Siepmann was elected to serve as councillor of Belecke (today a part of Warstein) in 1940. He was an active member of the Christian Democratic Union of Germany (CDU).

Private 
In 1933 Siepmann married Johanna Luise (née Trebs), known as Hannaliese. She was an educated concert pianist. She hails from on her paternal side from a doctors' family from Marburg on her maternal side from a merchant family from Korbach (Hesse). Her maternal grandfather Heinrich Wilke gained substantial wealth through mining and merchant activities in German South West Africa and Australia. The couple had four children;

 Dietrich Dieter (January 3, 1934 - January 15, 1960), died aged 26 from a brain tumor
 Karin (born 1936)
 Verena (born 1939)
 Walter, Jr. (July 29, 1943 - March 18, 2021), engineer and main heir to the Siepmann concern

In 1938/39 Siepmann acquired the local mountain Külbe from the Province of Westphalia respectively the local parish in Belecke. The main house Haus Möhnethal or according to other references also called Villa Siepmann has been his main residence since 1939, his youngest two children being born there. Siepmann also owned real estate in Munich, Bavaria.

Literature 

 Dr Mechthild Barthel-Kranzbühler; Ein Schmied versteht sich gut aufs Schweissen: 50 Jahre im Gesenk schmieden und schweissen In: Das Westfälische Sauerland, Belecke/Möhne 1976 (in German) 
 Dr Felix Rexhausen; Mit dem Blasrohr leben In: Der Spiegel; February 9, 1965 (in German) 
 Hermann August Ludwig Degener, Walter Habel; Siepmann, Walter In: The German Who is Who?, 1970

References

External links 

 Siepmann Group 
 PERSTA

1902 births
1985 deaths
German mechanical engineers
German scientists